Justin Kelly (born March 17, 1981) is a Canadian former professional ice hockey player.

Career 
Kelly was born in Abbotsford, British Columbia. Kelly spent five seasons in the WHL, including three and a half with the Saskatoon Blades. In 2001-02, he tallied 86 points (39 goals, 47 assists) in 72 games for the Blades, which ranked him tenth in the league.

The 2002-03 season saw him skate for Swedish side IF Troja/Ljungby.

Upon his return from Europe, Kelly spent three years playing on five teams in three leagues, AHL, UHL and ECHL, before bringing his game back to Europe: In the course of the 2006-07 season, Kelly featured for three clubs: Eishockey-Club Olten of Switzerland, EHC Linz of Austria and Val Pusteria of Italy.

Kelly embarked on a three-year stint with German second-division club Bietigheim Steelers in 2008 and would make 129 DEL2 appearances in three seasons, amassing a total of 167 points (64 goals, 103 assists). In 2009-10, he received Player of the Year honors. That attracted the attention of German top-tier side Krefeld Pinguine, who signed Kelly for the 2010-11 Deutsche Eishockey Liga (DEL) season. He moved to fellow DEL club DEG Metro Stars for the following campaign, which was hampered by a knee injury sustained in October 2011.

The 2012-13 season saw him return to IF Troja/Ljungby of Sweden, where he had signed his first overseas contract ten years earlier. Kelly then signed a deal with the Ravensburg Towerstars for the 2013-14 campaign, which turned out to be a very successful one: He scored 32 goals on the season to go along with 58 assists for a shared top spot in the DEL2 scoring ranks.

Kelly then returned to the Bietigheim Steelers for the 2014-15 season and in June 2015, had his contract renewed for 2015-16. In the 2015-16 season, he led the DEL2 in scoring with 85 points and for the second time was named DEL2 Player of the Year.

Career statistics

Awards and honours

References

External links

1981 births
Adirondack Frostbite players
SC Bietigheim-Bissingen players
Canadian expatriate ice hockey players in Austria
Canadian expatriate ice hockey players in Germany
Canadian expatriate ice hockey players in the United States
Canadian ice hockey right wingers
EHC Black Wings Linz players
DEG Metro Stars players
Deggendorfer SC players
Ice hockey people from British Columbia
Johnstown Chiefs players
Krefeld Pinguine players
Las Vegas Wranglers players
Living people
Lowell Lock Monsters players
EHC Olten players
Prince Albert Raiders players
HC Pustertal Wölfe players
Ravensburg Towerstars players
Saskatoon Blades players
Spokane Chiefs players
Sportspeople from Abbotsford, British Columbia
Springfield Falcons players
IF Troja/Ljungby players